Sandimen Township is a mountain indigenous township in Pingtung County, Taiwan Province, Republic of China. The population of the township consists mainly of the Paiwan people with a substantial Rukai minority.

Names
Ethnic Chinese settlers adapted the original Paiwan name into Hokkien (or ). Following the handover of Taiwan from Japan to the Republic of China in 1945, the area became Sandimeng Township but the name was changed again in 1947 to Sandi Township but the Taiwanese pronunciation of Soaⁿ-tē-mn̂g continued to be commonly used. In August 1992, the township assumed its current name.

History
Following the Kuomintang takeover of Taiwan in 1945, Sandimen was assigned to Kaohsiung County and, on 16 August 1950, it became a part of the newly established Pingtung County.

Geography
Population: 7,775 people (February 2023) 
Area:

Administrative divisions
The township comprises 10 villages: Anpo, Dalai, Dashe, Dewen, Jingshan, Jingye, Koushe, Mani, Saijia and Sande.

Tourist attractions
 Guchuan Bridge
 Maolin National Scenic Area

References

External links

Sandimen Government website 

Townships in Pingtung County
Taiwan placenames originating from Formosan languages